Meshalkin National Medical Research Center is a research and hospital institution in Sovetsky District of Novosibirsk, Russia. It was founded in 1957. The organisation is one of the largest Russian hospital for the treatment of cardiovascular diseases.

History
In 1957, the Institute of Experimental Biology and Medicine was established. It was headed by Moscow surgeon Evgeny Meshalkin.

In 2008, the Institute was named after Academician Evgeny Meshalkin.

See also
 Novosibirsk Research Institute of Traumatology and Orthopedics

References

External links
 Медицина уровня высоких технологий: Центр имени академика Е.Н. Мешалкина отметил юбилей. Новости сибирской науки. High-tech medicine: Center named after academician E. N. Meshalkin celebrated the anniversary. Novosti Sibirskoy Nauki. September 27, 2017.

Research institutes in Novosibirsk
Hospitals in Novosibirsk
Research institutes established in 1957
Medical research institutes in the Soviet Union
1957 establishments in the Soviet Union